Narang Pornsiriporn (born 14 April 2001) is a Thai swimmer. He competed in the men's 50 metre butterfly event at the 2017 World Aquatics Championships.

References

2001 births
Living people
Narang Pornsiriporn
Place of birth missing (living people)
Male butterfly swimmers
Narang Pornsiriporn